Flavia Senkubuge (born 1978 or 1979) is a South African physician, professor of public health medicine, an advocate of global public health and the immediate past President of the Colleges of Medicine of South Africa. At age 39, she was the college's youngest ever president and the first Black woman to hold the position.

Early life and education 

Senkubuge was raised in Lady Frere, then in the Transkei. She relocated to Queenstown in the Eastern Cape, where she attended Queenstown Girls High School to finish her high school education. As the 1996 Eastern Cape Matric of the year, she received the highest honor given in the region.

Research and career 

She graduated with a PhD in public health, an MMed in public health medicine and an MB ChB from the University of Pretoria. Additionally, she has a Fellowship of the College of Public Health Medicine of the Colleges of Medicine South Africa and an MBA from the Edinburgh Business School at Heriot-Watt University in the UK. She serves as the Deputy Dean: Health Stakeholder Relations in the Faculty of Health Sciences of the University of Pretoria. In her capacity as Chair of the WHO/AFRO African Advisory Council on Research and Development, she gives advice to the WHO/AFRO regional director on issues pertaining to health research and development in Africa. Senkubuge served as the president of the World Conference on Tobacco or Health.

Select publications

References 

Living people
Year of birth missing (living people)
South African women physicians
South African physicians
21st-century South African physicians
University of Pretoria alumni
Alumni of the University of Edinburgh Business School
21st-century women physicians